Puerto Rico Highway 132 (PR-132) is a secondary highway that connects the town of Guayanilla to the city of Ponce, Puerto Rico. The road runs through the town of Peñuelas before reaching Ponce. In Ponce, PR-132 starts where Calle Villa ends.

History
The highway resulted from the old road connecting Ponce to Peñuelas via Barrio Canas.

Future
In August 2011, a bill was introduced in the Puerto Rico Senate to build a new highway that would take over some of the traffic currently on PR-132. The new road may start off at PR-500 and connect to PR-127. The proposed road would also take over some of the traffic currently on PR-2.

Major intersections

See also

 List of highways in Ponce, Puerto Rico
 List of highways numbered 132
 List of streets in Ponce, Puerto Rico

References

External links
 

132